Brighter than a Thousand Suns: A Personal History of the Atomic Scientists, by Austrian Robert Jungk, is the first published account of the Manhattan Project and the German atomic bomb project.

History
The book studied the making and dropping of the atomic bomb from the viewpoints of the atomic scientists.  The book is largely based on personal interviews with persons who played leading parts in the construction and deployment of the bombs.

In 1956 the book was published in German by Alfred Scherz Verlag with the title Heller als tausend Sonnen.  James Cleugh translated it into English, and it was published in 1958 by Harcourt, Brace and Company.

The book's title is based on the verse from the Bhagavad Gita that J. Robert Oppenheimer is said to have recalled at the Trinity nuclear test.

Controversy  

Later in life Robert Jungk no longer stood behind some portions of his book. In a foreword published in a 1990 book on Germany's wartime atomic research  he appeared to accuse Carl Friedrich von Weizsäcker and Werner Heisenberg, both of whom he consulted during the writing, of misleading him about the intentions of German physicists during World War II.

In The New World, 1939–1946, a history commissioned by the U.S. Atomic Energy Commission and published in 1962, historians Richard G. Hewlett and Oscar E. Anderson describe the book as "hopelessly inaccurate".

In a 1967 interview, the military head of the Manhattan Project, General Leslie Groves, said:

See also
Alexander Sachs

Notes

Books about the atomic bombings of Hiroshima and Nagasaki
Books about the Manhattan Project
Books about scientists
1958 non-fiction books